Out of Mind: The Stories of H. P. Lovecraft is a 1998 television film based on the writings of H. P. Lovecraft and starring Christopher Heyerdahl as H. P. Lovecraft.

Overview
Haunted by dark dreams of an inherited book, the Necronomicon, a young man becomes intrigued by the writings of H. P. Lovecraft.

References

External links

1998 television films
1998 films
1990s English-language films
Films about books
Films about writers
Films based on short fiction
Films based on works by H. P. Lovecraft
American television films
American anthology films